Robert William Pearce is an Australian judge, who was appointed as a judge of the Supreme Court of Tasmania in June 2013, and is the only member of the Court based in Launceston, Tasmania.

Background
Pearce was conferred Bachelor of Arts combined with Bachelor of Laws in 1981.

Judicial career

In 2009, Pearce was appointed a Magistrate, of the Magistrates Court of Tasmania.

After his appointment as a judge of the Supreme Court of Tasmania, in 2014, Pearce later presided over the trial of Marco Daniel Rusterholz for the 2012 murders of Angela Hallam and Joshua Newman. Pearce later convicted Rusterholz and sentenced him to 45 years’ imprisonment.

References

Australian judges
University of Tasmania alumni
Year of birth missing (living people)
Living people